The men's giant slalom competition of the Beijing 2022 Olympics was held on 13 February, on "Ice River" course at the Yanqing National Alpine Ski Centre in Yanqing District. Marco Odermatt of Switzerland won the event. Žan Kranjec of Slovenia won the silver medal, and Mathieu Faivre of France bronze. For all of them, they got their first Olympic medals.

Marcel Hirscher, the 2018 champion, retired from competitions. The silver medalist, Henrik Kristoffersen, and the bronze medalist, Alexis Pinturault, qualified for the Olympics. At the 2021–22 FIS Alpine Ski World Cup, six giant slalom events were held before the Olympics. Marco Odermatt was leading the ranking, followed by Manuel Feller and Kristoffersen. Mathieu Faivre was the 2021 world champion, with Luca De Aliprandini and Marco Schwarz being the silver and bronze medalists, respectively.

Kranjec, the eight in the first run, had a good second run and was leading the competition, while skiers with better first run either did not finish or had a worse total. Faivre, with the third time in the first run, was the best of these. Odermatt, who won the first run, was skiing last in the second run and remained on top.

Qualification

Results
Results are as follows:

References

Men's alpine skiing at the 2022 Winter Olympics